Tank is a 1984 American action drama film, directed by Marvin J. Chomsky and starring James Garner, Shirley Jones, Jenilee Harrison and C. Thomas Howell. The film was written by Dan Gordon. It was produced by Lorimar Productions and was commercially released in the United States by Universal Pictures on March 16, 1984.

Plot
U.S. Army Command Sergeant Major Zack Carey (played by Garner) is about to retire from the military after taking his last post in rural Clemmons County, Georgia (loosely based on Fort Benning, largely in Chattahoochee County, Georgia). Despite being offered the possibility of becoming Sergeant Major of the Army, he insists he just wishes to finish his tour and retire in peace to spend time with his family. Several years earlier, his older son had been killed in an Army training accident, and his relationship with his only surviving son, Billy (played by Howell), is strained. Zack's no-nonsense, unpretentious style of leadership quickly earns him a reputation on-post as a tough but fair NCO, well-regarded for his compassion and integrity.

Zack owns a vintage Sherman tank from World War II that he has restored with his younger son's help, and he drives it for parades and other public events. While visiting an off-base bar, he meets a young woman named Sarah (Jenilee Harrison) and the two of them strike up a conversation over drinks. During their conversation, the local deputy sheriff, Euclid Baker (James Cromwell) sees them together and orders Sarah to get back to work, insulting her and slapping her in the process. Carey quickly intervenes, subduing the deputy.

Sarah had been forced into prostitution by Cyrus Buelton, the corrupt sheriff (G. D. Spradlin). Sheriff Buelton tries to arrest Carey, but finds he has no jurisdiction while Carey is on the base, which is federal property. Upon discovering that Billy attends a public school off-post, Buelton has marijuana planted in Billy's locker and arrests him. When Zack comes to him seeking terms of truce, Sheriff Buelton offers to drop the charges if Carey gives him a hefty bribe, roughly equal to his retirement savings. Zack hesitates and considers the deal, but his wife, LaDonna (Shirley Jones) refuses to take part in "good old boy" justice and calls a lawyer. The lawyer is thrown into jail himself on trumped-up contempt of court charges, Billy is put on trial immediately without benefit of counsel and sentenced to several years of hard labor. LaDonna, finally realizing the depths of Sheriff Buelton's corruption and cruelty, goes to Zack and tells him what happened. When Carey tries to offer the bribe, Buelton accepts the money, but refuses to release his son, simply stating that it will prevent him from being shot "accidentally" or while "attempting to escape", or from being raped by other inmates – temporarily.

Carey decides to take matters into his own hands, delivers his resignation, and climbs into his vintage tank, destroying the local jail and police station and releasing Billy's lawyer. With Sarah tagging along, Carey departs for the county work farm, where they use the tank to liberate Billy and flee the town. His plan is to escape to neighboring Tennessee, where they can get a fair hearing regarding extradition. While repairing a shed track, though, Carey is injured, and Billy takes command of the Sherman.

Buelton demands military intervention from Carey's commanding general, Major General V.E. Hubik (Sandy Ward). The general points out that Carey had already retired from the Army, so he has broken no military law. Buelton then demands that Hubik order the post's personnel and tanks to pursue Carey, and that if refused, he will call the governor of Georgia. Hubik again declines, this time citing the Posse Comitatus Act, which states that the Department of Defense is prevented from interfering in domestic law enforcement outside the military reservation without approval from his superiors or the President of the United States. (As a running joke for the remainder of the film, an ignorant Buelton misinterprets the act's name as a dismissive insult of himself as a "pussy Communist".)

Through a long series of chases and evasion through rural Georgia, while being aided by relatives of people jailed by Buelton and who died while incarcerated, the tank and its crew quickly become folk heroes. Despite Sheriff Buelton insisting they are criminals, the nation rallies behind them as a sort of modern-day Robin Hood. On the Tennessee side of the line, thousands of people gather to welcome the tank. Meanwhile, LaDonna has met with the governor of Tennessee, where she, with use of a rather direct and blunt threat of blackmail, manages to get a formal guarantee that they will be given a proper extradition hearing.

A showdown brews at the Tennessee state line, where a huge crowd of supporters for the tank and its crew has gathered. Using a vintage antitank weapon, Buelton manages to immobilize the tank within a mud flat, forcing Billy to consider surrender. However, a motorcycle gang intervenes and attaches a wire rope to the tank, and the assembled crowd works to pull the Sherman out of the trap. Buelton goes as far as to order his posse to fire at the crowd, prompting a large line of Tennessee state troopers to draw their weapons in response, threatening to "turn this into another 'Little Big Horn'". Buelton and his men then race into the mud flat and begin pulling on their end against the crowd. Reaching a stalemate, Hubik takes charge and has a bulldozer brought over to help free the tank. Celebrating his apparent victory, Buelton climbs onto the tank and orders its occupants to surrender, but instead, Zack instructs Billy to rotate the tank's turret, which knocks him off and face down into the mud. Meanwhile, the bulldozer begins pulling the tank free of the mud with the renewed help of the crowd. This time, the posse's efforts to stop them are futile, and the tank is successfully pulled over the state line. Zack, Billy and Sarah climb out of the tank to a hero's welcome by LaDonna and the people and the governor of Tennessee.

Cast
 James Garner as CSM Zack Carey
 Shirley Jones as LaDonna Carey
 C. Thomas Howell as William "Billy" Carey
 Mark Herrier as SSG Jerry Elliott, Soldier Magazine Reporter
 Sandy Ward as MG V.E. Hubik
 Jenilee Harrison as Sarah
 James Cromwell as Deputy Euclid Baker
 Dorian Harewood as SFC Ed Tippet, Provost Marshal's Office
 G. D. Spradlin as Sheriff Cyrus Buelton
 John Hancock as Mess MSG Johnson
 Guy Boyd as SGT Wimofsky
 Randy Bass as Governor's Aide

Production 
Tank was filmed at Fort Benning and in the small town of Zebulon, Georgia. The final tank scene at the faux Tennessee state line was filmed in southwest Atlanta, at the southeast intersection of Fulton Industrial Blvd (Georgia Highway  70/154) and  Campbellton Rd. (Georgia Highway 166).

The titular tank was a 1942 M4 Sherman, made by Ford Motor Company and owned by collector Dave Ropkey who still displays the tank in the Ropkey Armor Museum in Crawfordsville, Indiana. The tank previously made an appearance in The Blues Brothers.

In his memoirs Garner called the film "just a workaday movie with nothing outstanding about it. I had fun making it, though, because I got to drive a Sherman tank and crash into things."

See also
 List of American films of 1984

References

External links

 
 
 
 
 
James Garner Interview on the Charlie Rose Show
James Garner interview at Archive of American Television

1984 films
1980s action comedy films
American war comedy films
Films about armoured warfare
Films directed by Marvin J. Chomsky
Military humor in film
American action comedy films
Films produced by Irwin Yablans
Films scored by Lalo Schifrin
Films about the United States Army
1980s war comedy films
1984 comedy films
1980s English-language films
1980s American films